Duke of Abrantes is a hereditary title in the Peerage of Spain, accompanied by the dignity of Grandee and granted in 1642 by Philip IV to Alfonso de Láncaster, son of the 3rd Duke of Aveiro and a great-grandchild of John II of Portugal. It takes its name from the city of Abrantes in Portugal.

Bernardo de Carvajal y Moctezuma, 2nd Count of Enjarada, is an ancestor of the Dukes of Abrantes, thereby making them descendants of Doña Isabel Moctezuma and the Aztec Emperor Moctezuma II. This ducal family formerly owned the Palacio de los Toledo-Moctezuma at Cáceres in Spain.

The Habsburgs were deposed from the Portuguese throne in 1640, two years before this dukedom was created. The title was never recognised in Portugal, but it remains extant in Spain. The present Duke of Abrantes, who is also a Grandee of Spain, is Don José Manuel de Zuleta y Alejandro, who is the Secretary of Queen Letizia of Spain.

Buildings
Recreo de las Cadenas
Palacio del Marqués de Casa Riera

Dukes of Abrantes (1642)

Alfonso de Láncaster y Enríquez de Girón, 1st Duke of Abrantes
Agustín de Láncaster y Sande, 2nd Duke of Abrantes
Juan Manuel de Láncaster y Noroña, 3rd Duke of Abrantes
Juan Antonio de Carvajal y Láncaster, 4th Duke of Abrantes
Manuel Bernardino de Carvajal y Zúñiga, 5th Duke of Abrantes
Ángel María de Carvajal y Gonzaga, 6th Duke of Abrantes
Manuel Guillermo de Carvajal y Fernández de Córdoba, 7th Duke of Abrantes
Ángel María de Carvajal y Fernández de Córdoba, 8th Duke of Abrantes
Ángel María de Carvajal y Téllez-Girón, 9th Duke of Abrantes
Ángel Luis de Carvajal y Fernández de Córdoba y Téllez-Girón, 10th Duke of Abrantes
Manuel Bernardino de Carvajal y Gutiérrez de la Concha, 11th Duke of Abrantes
Carmen de Carvajal y del Alcázar, 12th Duke of Abrantes
Diego de Zuleta y Carvajal, 13th Duke of Abrantes
José Manuel Zuleta y Carvajal, 14th Duke of Abrantes
José Manuel Zuleta y Alejandro, 15th Duke of Abrantes

See also
List of dukes in the peerage of Spain
List of current Grandees of Spain

References 

Dukedoms of Spain
Grandees of Spain
Lists of dukes
Lists of Spanish nobility